Wayne Beddison (born 24 August 1961) is a former Australian rules footballer who played with Essendon in the Victorian Football League (VFL).

Beddison, a Dimboola recruit, played 10 games for Essendon, all in the 1983 VFL season. He took one of the best marks of the 1983 season, on debut, at the Sydney Cricket Ground. A forward, his 18 goals that year included a six-goal haul in a win over the Sydney Swans at Windy Hill in round 12. He didn't take part in Essendon's finals campaign, but was a member of their reserves premiership team, before returning to Dimboola after the grand final win.

References

1961 births
Australian rules footballers from Victoria (Australia)
Essendon Football Club players
Dimboola Football Club players
Living people